The speckle-breasted antpitta (Cryptopezus nattereri) is a species of bird in the family Grallariidae. It is found in Argentina, Brazil, and Paraguay. It is monotypic in the genus Cryptopezus. Its natural habitats are subtropical or tropical moist lowland forest and subtropical or tropical moist montane forest.

References

speckle-breasted antpitta
Birds of the Atlantic Forest
speckle-breasted antpitta
Taxonomy articles created by Polbot
Taxobox binomials not recognized by IUCN